"Walking on Sunshine" is a song written by Kimberley Rew for British rock band Katrina and the Waves' 1983 eponymous debut full-length album. The rerecorded version was at first released on the band's 1985 self-titled album as the album's second single and reached No. 4 in Australia, No. 9 in the United States and No. 8 in the United Kingdom. It was the Waves' first American top 40 hit, and their biggest success in the UK until "Love Shine a Light" (1997).

Background
"Walking on Sunshine" was written by the band's guitarist Kimberley Rew. "I'd love to say Walking on Sunshine relates to a significant event in my life, like walking out of my front door, seeing a comet and being inspired," he told The Guardian in 2015. "But it's just a piece of simple fun, an optimistic song, despite us not being outstandingly cheery people. We were a typical young band, insecure and pessimistic. We didn't have big hair and didn't look anything like a Motown-influenced group. We didn't have any credibility or a fanbase in awe of our mystique. We were a second-on-the-bill-at-a-festival-in-Germany pop band. But we had this song."

The rest of the band did not like the song at first. Lead singer Katrina Leskanich thought "it wasn't really us", while bassist Vince de la Cruz found it irritating.

Success
Katrina and the Waves kept the song's publishing rights, and the royalties that are typically to the songwriter have been divided among the band members. The royalties from airplay and advertisements have been very lucrative; according to a former employee of EMI, the song was "the crown jewel in EMI's catalog," and it ranked among EMI's highest earners from advertisements.

When Hurricane Katrina devastated much of the U.S. Gulf Coast in 2005, the MSNBC program Countdown with Keith Olbermann dubbed its coverage of the storm "Katrina and the Waves." The name also appeared in numerous headlines and blog postings. A New York Times reporter contacted Katrina Leskanich, who said: "The first time I opened the paper and saw 'Katrina kills 9,' it was a bit of a shock. ... I hope that the true spirit of 'Walking on Sunshine' will prevail. I would hate for the title to be tinged with sadness, and I will have to do my own part to help turn that around." She also expressed her hope that "Walking on Sunshine" would become an anthem for the Gulf Coast's recovery.

In 2010, the 25th anniversary of the release of "Walking on Sunshine," the band's material was re-released and a re-recorded version of the track was produced. A free download of a track from Kimberley Rew's solo album Bible of Bop was made available in March 2010 at the band's website.

In August 2015, the song was acquired by BMG Rights Management for £10 million, along with all of the other songs written by Rew and Katrina and the Waves.

In a 2020 interview, Leskanich said that she believes that the song is going to outlive her.

Charts

Weekly charts

Year-end charts

Certifications

In popular culture
The song is very popular in commercials, and advertisers typically pay $150,000 to $200,000 per year to use the song. This song appeared in a mashup with Beyoncé's "Halo" in the popular television show Glee, featured in the Season 1 episode "Vitamin D." It was performed by the female members of the glee club New Directions, with featured solos by Rachel Berry (Lea Michele) and Mercedes Jones (Amber Riley). It was released as a single on October 7, 2009 through digital download on iTunes, and debuted on the Billboard Hot 100 at number 40 while reaching number 4 in Ireland, number 9 in the UK and number 10 in Australia. The song is featured as a cover on the dance rhythm game Just Dance 2023 Edition. In Futurama, it's Philip J. Fry's favorite song, and in the Season 4 episode "The Sting", the Planet Express janitor Scruffy plays a bagpipe version at Fry's funeral.

References

1983 songs
1985 singles
1997 singles
2005 singles
Katrina and the Waves songs
Aly & AJ songs
Capitol Records singles
Hollywood Records singles
Songs written by Kimberley Rew